The  Siskiyou Wilderness is a federal wilderness area designated by the passage of the California Wilderness Act of 1984. All of the wilderness is in Northern California and is managed by the U.S. Forest Service. The wilderness spans three national forests: the Rogue River–Siskiyou, the Klamath, and the Six Rivers.

The Siskiyou Mountains form one of the longest continuous crests in the Klamath Mountains region.

Flora and fauna 
The Siskiyou Wilderness contains a diverse collection of conifer species including rarities such as Alaska cedar, Port Orford cedar, and the Klamath Mountains-endemic Brewer spruce. It is notable for the vast amounts of old-growth forests and many endemic species of wildflowers, shrubs and trees, as well as one of the world's largest concentrations of lilies.

The wilderness is home to several rare species, including wolverine, martin, fisher, northern spotted owl and Roosevelt elk. There is also black bear, black-tailed deer, and many varieties of birds. The clear streams provide spawning grounds for steelhead, coho and Chinook salmon.

Recreation 

The Clear Creek National Recreation Trail crosses  of the northern portion and provides access to some of the more scenic parts of the wilderness—from near the Klamath River to the Smith River (California) divide. The most heavily visited areas are in the northwest corner of the region—concentrated on trails that lead to lakes. Much of the area lacks trails and is difficult to access cross-country because of the dense brush. The Bigfoot Trail traverses the crest of the wilderness from north to south, through some of the most remote areas.

Climate

See also

Young Fire

Footnotes

References

External links 

 Siskiyou Wilderness: Six Rivers National Forest
 Siskiyou Wilderness: Rogue River–Siskiyou National Forest
 Siskiyou Wilderness: Klamath National Forest
 Preston Peak Botanical and Geological Area
 Hike Description to the Devil's Punchbowl

Klamath Mountains
Rogue River-Siskiyou National Forest
Protected areas of Del Norte County, California
Protected areas of Humboldt County, California
Protected areas of Siskiyou County, California
Wilderness areas of California
IUCN Category Ib
Klamath National Forest
Six Rivers National Forest
1984 establishments in California
Protected areas established in 1984